Peter Roy Katin (14 November 193019 March 2015) was a British classical pianist and teacher.

Biography
Katin was born in London; his father was sign-painter Jerrold Katin (who was born in Lithuania) and mother Gertrude. Katin was educated at private schools in Balham, Caterham, and East Grinstead and the Henry Thornton School (then known as the South West London Emergency Secondary School) in Clapham, and was admitted to the Royal Academy of Music at the age of 12, four years younger than the official entry age, where he studied under Harold Craxton. Katin made his debut at the Wigmore Hall on 13 December 1948 where the programme included works by Scarlatti, Mozart, Beethoven, Rachmaninoff, Scriabin and Chopin. He went on to give concerts in England, Europe, Africa, the US, and Japan.

In 1952, Katin debuted at The Proms and in 1953 was acclaimed for his performance there of Rachmaninoff's Piano Concerto No. 3 in D minor. In 1958, he became the first British pianist to make a post-war solo tour of the Soviet Union. In 1961, the composer Bryan Kelly wrote Tango especially for Katin.

Katin specialised in Romantic music, particularly Chopin, and Impressionist music. He was acclaimed for his technical command of the piano. He also directed concertos by Mozart and Beethoven from the keyboard.  His final Wigmore Hall recital was in January 2004.

Katin wrote many articles on piano technique and interpretation. He lectured at the Royal Academy of Music 1956–1959, University of Western Ontario 1978–1984, and in 1992 was appointed to the Royal College of Music. He also lectured at Thames Valley University.  He supported the Campaign for Homosexual Equality in the 1970s.

In 1954, Katin married fellow pianist, Ewa Zweig, with whom he had two sons, Nicholas and Andrew.  After a long separation, they divorced in 1988. He lived in Bexhill-on-Sea.  His two sons survive him.

Recordings
Katin's recordings include:

Ludwig van Beethoven 
 Violin Sonata in C minor, Op. 30 No. 2 (with Alfredo Campoli, violin) (with other works) Orchestral Concert CDs CD3/2009

Johannes Brahms 
 A Brahms Recital: 
Fantasias Op. 116, Three Intermezzi Op. 117, Two Rhapsodies Op. 79, Variations and Fugue on a Theme of Handel Op. 24 (Olympia OCD 263)
 Peter Katin in Recital: Liszt and Brahms
Liszt: Sonata in B minor
Brahms: Variations and Fugue on a theme of Handel
Liszt: Sonetto 123 del Petrarca (Années de Pélérinage, Book 2)
Athene-Minerva ATHCD9 23009
 Brahms: Violin Sonata No. 3 in D minor, Op. 108 (with Alfredo Campoli, violin) (with other works) Orchestral Concert CDs CD3/2009
 His playing of Brahms's Piano Concerto No. 1 was used as background music to the film The L-Shaped Room (1962).

Frédéric Chopin
 Chopin: First and Last
Variations Brilliantes, Op. 12, Mazurka in G minor, Op. 24, No. 1, Mazurka in C major, Op. 24, No. 2, Mazurka in A flat major, Op. 24, No. 3, Mazurka in B flat minor, Op. 24, No. 4, Mazurka in F minor, Op. 68, No. 4, Rondo in C minor, Op. 1, Souvenir de Paganini, Nocturne in C sharp minor, Waltz in D flat major, Op. 64, No. 1, Waltz in C sharp minor, Op. 64, No. 2, Waltz in A flat major, Op. 64, No. 3, Sonata in C minor, Op. 4 (3rd mvmt), Polonaise in G minor, KK IIa, No. 1, Polonaise in B flat major, KK IVa, No. 1, Polonaise in A flat major, KK Iva, No. 2, Berceuse, Op. 57
Athene ATHCD11 / Diversions DIV24116
 Ballade in F minor, Op. 52; 3 Mazurkas, Op. 59; Sonata in B minor, Op. 58; Barcarolle, Op. 60; Polonaise-Fantasie Op. 61 Olympia OCD 186
 Variations, Op. 12; 4 Mazurkas, Op. 24; Sonata in B flat minor, Op. 35; Ballade in A flat, Op. 47; Andante Spianato and Grande Polonaise, Op. 22   Olympia OCD 193
 Complete Polonaises and Waltzes   Olympia OCD 289A/B
 4 Scherzos; Fantasy, Op. 49   Unicorn UKCD 2008*
 Complete Nocturnes and Impromptus   Olympia OCD 254A/B
 4 Waltzes (part of compilation album)   Belart 450 000-2
 Polonaise in F sharp minor, Op. 24; Sonata in B minor, Op. 58; Nocturne in D flat, Op. 27, No. 2; Fantasy, Op. 49 (live recording from the Snape Maltings   Hallmark 350142
 Complete Nocturnes (different version to the Olympia issue)   Hallmark IMP 30367 02357 (2CD)
 Peter Katin: A Chopin Recital
Four Songs from Seventeen Polish Songs (transcribed by Liszt), Op. posth. 74; Piano Sonata No. 3 in B minor, Op. 58; Scherzo No. 4 in E major, Op. 54; Mazurka No. 14 in G minor, Op. 24 No. 1; Andante spianato et grande polonaise brillante in E flat major, Op. 22; Nocturne in F sharp major, Op. 15 No. 2; Waltz in C sharp minor, Op. 64 No. 2
(Recording issued in 2010 to mark Katin's 80th birthday and Chopin's 200th anniversary)   Orchestral Concert CDs CD11/2010

Muzio Clementi 
 Clementi on Clementi
Sonata in F sharp minor, Op.25, No. 5, Sonata in B flat major, Op. 24, No. 2, Sonata in G minor, Op. 7, No. 3, Sonata in D major, Op. 25, No. 6, Sonata in F minor, Op.13, No. 6
Athene ATHCD4 / Diversions DIV24113

Edvard Grieg
 Ballade, Op. 24; 5 Klavierstücke nach Eigenen Lieren; Sonata in E minor, Op. 7; 4 Lyric Pieces Olympia OCD 197
 Complete Lyric Pieces Unicorn UKCD 2033-5*
 Piano Concerto in A minor, Op. 16 Classics for Pleasure CFP 160 (1971)

Aram Khachaturian;
 Piano Concerto in D-flat major (LSO/Hugo Rignold); César Franck: Symphonic Variations (LSO/Eugene Goossens) Everest EVC 9060

Franz Liszt
 Dante Sonata; 3 Liebesträume; 2 Polonaises; 6 Consolations Olympia OCD 199
 Peter Katin in Recital: Liszt and Brahms
Liszt: Sonata in B minor
Brahms: Variations and Fugue on a theme of Handel
Liszt: Sonetto 123 del Petrarca (Années de Pélérinage, Book 2)
Athene-Minerva ATHCD9 23009

William Mathias 
 Piano Concerto No. 3 (LSO/Atherton) (with other works) Lyrita SRCD 325

Felix Mendelssohn 
 2 Piano Concertos; (LSO/Colins); 2 Concert Pieces (LPO/Martinon); c/w other Mendelssohn works played by John Ogdon & Brenda Lucas Double Decca 4524102

Wolfgang Amadeus Mozart
 Complete Piano Sonatas Olympia OCD 230-4 (boxed set OCD5003)
 Piano Sonatas (Altara ALT 1026, 5 CDs)
 Violin Sonata in A major, K526 (with Alfredo Campoli, violin) (with other works) Orchestral Concert CDs CD3/2009

Sergei Prokofiev;
 Piano Concerto No. 3 (Prague Symphony Orchestra/Košler) (with other works) Orchestral Concert CDs CD2/2008

Sergei Rachmaninoff 
 Piano Concerto No. 1 (LPO/Boult) Belart 461 3482
 Piano Concerto No. 2 The New Symphony Orchestra of London/Colin Davis London ffrr STS 15225
 Complete Preludes Hallmark IMP PCD2052

Domenico Scarlatti 
 14 Sonatas Claudio CR35102-2

Franz Schubert 
 Impromptus, D.899 and D.935 (Clementi square piano 1832) Athene ATHCD5 / Diversions 24112
 3 Klavierstücke, D.946; Valses Nobles, D.969; Moments Musicaux, D.780 (Clementi 1832) Athene ATHCD7 / Diversions DIV23007
 Sonatas in B-flat, D.960 & A minor, D.537 Olympia OCD 188
 Drei Klavierstücke, D.946; Valses Nobles, D.969; Moments Musicaux, D.780
(Played on a Clementi square piano of 1832.)
Athene-Minerva ATHCD7 / Diversions DIV23007
 Impromptus, D.899 and D.935
Four Impromptus, D.899
Four Impromptus, D.935
Diversions CD24112

Robert Schumann
 Kinderszenen, Op. 15; Sonata in G minor, Op. 22; Carnaval Op. 9 Olympia OCD 218
 Piano Concerto (LSO/Goossens) (with other works) Everest EVC 9045-6

Pyotr Ilyich Tchaikovsky 
 Sonata in G, Op. 37; The Seasons, Op. 37a Olympia OCD 192
 Piano Concerto No. 1; Grieg: Piano Concerto; Litolff: Scherzo (with LSO/LPO, cond Edric Kundell, Sir Colin Davis) Olympia OCD 235
 Piano Concerto No. 1; Litolff: Scherzo (LPO/Pritchard) Classics for Pleasure 5 72699 2
Tchaikovsky: Concert Fantasia in G major, Op.56; Rachmaninov: Piano Concerto No.1 in F sharp minor Op.1 (LPO/Boult) Decca SXL 2034

William Walton 
 Sinfonia Concertante (LSO/Walton) (with other works) Lyrita SRCD 224

Ralph Vaughan Williams 
 Fantasia on the Old 104th (LPO/LPC/Boult) (with other works) EMI CDM 769962-2

 Others 
 Portrait of a pianist: Bach: Chromatic Fantasy and Fugue; Beethoven: 6 Variations, Op. 34; Haydn: Sonata in G, HobXVI/39; Debussy: Estampes; Liszt: Vallée d’Obermann   Olympia OCD 189
 Claude Debussy, Children's Corner: Gabriel Grovlez, L'Almamach aus Images; Déodat de Séverac, En Vacances; Jacques Ibert, Histoires; Simax PSC 1067
 Peter Katin: 50 years of music making
Bach: Prelude and Fugue in B flat minor (from the Well Tempered Clavier – Book 1)
Mozart: Rondo in A minor
Beethoven: Piano Sonata, Op. 27, No. 2 ("Moonlight")
Schubert: Impromptus in G flat and E flat, from D.899
Debussy: Suite bergamasque
Chopin: Polonaise-Fantaisie, Op. 61
RP Music RP001

References

External links
Peter Katin Scarlatti Review & Track listing
 Peter Katin
 Peter Katin (Impulse)
 David Wright interviews Peter Katin (includes a fairly comprehensive discography)  
 New York Times concert review
 , WNCN-FM, 24 September 1982

1930 births
2015 deaths
British Jews
Musicians from London
British classical pianists
Male classical pianists
20th-century classical pianists
20th-century English musicians
Alumni of the Royal Academy of Music
Academics of the University of West London
Piano pedagogues
People from Bexhill-on-Sea
Academics of the Royal Academy of Music
Academics of the Royal College of Music
Academic staff of the University of Western Ontario
20th-century British male musicians